This is the discography for the work of rock band 50 Foot Wave.

Albums

Studio albums

Live albums

EPs

Singles

References

50 Foot Wave
50 Foot Wave